The Turtles are an American rock band formed in Los Angeles, California in 1965, whose best-known lineup included Howard Kaylan, Mark Volman, Al Nichol, Chuck Portz, Jim Tucker and Don Murray. Originating from an earlier surf band called the Crossfires, the Turtles first achieved success with a sound that fused folk music with rock and roll, but would achieve greater success with pop music, scoring their biggest and best-known hit in 1967 with the song "Happy Together". They charted several other top 40 hits, including "It Ain't Me Babe" (1965), "You Baby" (1966), "She'd Rather Be With Me" (1967), "Elenore" (1968) and "You Showed Me" (1969). Worldwide, The Turtles released 5 studio albums, 20 compilation albums, 7 extended plays and 26 singles.

1967's Golden Hits is notable for featuring remixes of "It Ain't Me Babe", "Let Me Be" and "You Baby". These are the only remixes done on early album tracks as the multi-tracks went missing shortly thereafter. These three remixes are almost always used on compilations, instead of the original wide stereo mixes.
The 1970 album More Golden Hits contains stereo mixes of "Sound Asleep", "She's My Girl", and "Who Would Ever Think That I Would Marry Margaret?". The first two were briefly available on CD reissues in the mid-'90s, while the latter remained unique to More Golden Hits until its inclusion on All the Singles.

Wooden Head was a compilation album composed of unissued recordings, circa 1966. The Chalon Road compilation gathered together many unissued and 45-only tracks. Shell Shock was a compilation of material intended for an album recorded in 1969 that remained unfinished.

Albums

Studio albums

Compilations

Singles 

The artist credit for the 1970 single "Teardrops" reads "The Dedications". This single was issued without the band's knowledge or consent, and "The Dedications" concept was concocted by White Whale. All singles issued after this one (except for the 1978 12″) were released without the band's input or approval, but all are credited to The Turtles, regardless.

References
Notes

Turtles
Discography
Folk music discographies
Rock music group discographies
Pop music group discographies